The ancient Egyptian Censer pot, (the Incense burner: pot) is most commonly seen in Ancient Egyptian iconography as an offering, held in hand by the offering person or god. Many pots are offered in hands, or a single hand with offerings of oils, a liquid-(water), or other item in the pot.

An alternative, a censer pot is shown with a burning flame, or a flickering cone of smoke above; the censer pot is trapezoidal in shape often, and also often with curved-inward sides, (a flared-out flat top).

The other common form of a censer in Ancient Egypt, as an offering, is a horizontal 'arm with upraised palm', with the palm being the incense burning area.

Incense pot with flame hieroglyph

As a hieroglyph, the censer pot hieroglyph is more common in texts.

The other common type of hieroglyph for the burning of incense, is the incense burner: arm (hieroglyph). In later periods of Ancient Egypt it was often made of bronze. In portrayed scenes with the arm, the offerer, most often the pharaoh offering to the god, is shown adding incense pellets from a small storage box at the base of the arm.

Incense
Incense has a long history in Ancient Egypt, as well as the Mesopotamian cultures. Iconographic examples, and the literature of offerings performed, attest to the rituals of both cultures and a cultural evolution of their usages.

See also

Incense burner: arm (hieroglyph)
Gardiner's Sign List#R. Temple Furniture and Sacred Emblems
List of Egyptian hieroglyphs

References
Budge.  An Egyptian Hieroglyphic Dictionary, E.A.Wallace Budge, (Dover Publications), c 1978, (c 1920), Dover edition, 1978. (In two volumes) (softcover)

Egyptian hieroglyphs: temple furniture and emblems
Incense equipment